Warninglid (historically known as Warninglyth and Warningeld) is a small village in the Mid Sussex District of West Sussex, England. The name Warninglid is believed to originate from two words, Werna and Gelad (meaning "Werna's Path".) It is in the civil parish of Slaugham.

At the centre of the village is a crossroads, and there sits the Half Moon public house. A nearby village - Handcross - provides the post office and convenience store for the locals.  Over the last quarter century the village has won the Best-Kept Village competition three times.

There is one school serving Warninglid, namely Warninglid Primary School. The school teaches 60 students and is led by Headteacher Marion West.

References

External links

Villages in West Sussex
Mid Sussex District